Ajax Life is the largest Dutch fanzine/newspaper, with a bi-weekly circulation of approximately . Ajax Life is based in Amsterdam. Erol Erdogan is the editor-in-chief of the paper.

Ajax Life is owned by the Supportersvereniging Ajax (SVA).

History
Founded in 1989 as gloss-covered 200-page bi-monthly Magazine, the publication was later changed to a bi-weekly newspaper, with occasional special edition magazines as well. Under SVA chairman Jan van Vugt, the bi monthly magazine was converted into a bi-weekly newspaper in the year 2000. Having been in circulation for over two decades, it is one of the longest running fanzine/supporters publication in the Netherlands with the furthest reach, with 94,000 subscribers in 2013.

See also
 1900 magazine
 Ajax Magazine
 Ajax-nieuws
 Supportersvereniging Ajax

References

External links
 Ajaxlife.nl, the newspaper's online version 
 Ajaxlife.mobi, the newspaper's mobile online version 

1989 establishments in the Netherlands
AFC Ajax
Dutch-language magazines
Football fanzines
Magazines established in 1989
Magazines published in Amsterdam